Franklin Hanway was an American politician from Maryland. He served as a member of the Maryland House of Delegates, representing Harford County in 1858.

Career
Hanway served as a committee clerk with the Maryland House of Delegates. Hanway served as a member of the Maryland House of Delegates, representing Harford County in 1858.

References

Year of birth unknown
Year of death missing
People from Harford County, Maryland
Members of the Maryland House of Delegates
19th-century American politicians